Life Is Easy is a compilation album by Birmingham-based industrial metal group Fall of Because, compiling songs recorded in 1986 and 1987 before the band became Godflesh. Released on 24 August 1999 through Alleysweeper and distributed by Martin Atkins' label Invisible Records, Life Is Easy contains many songs that went on to be rerecorded and turned into Godflesh tracks.

Background and content

Following the recording of a demo called Extirpate in 1986, Fall of Because disbanded and reformed in 1988 as Godflesh. Life Is Easy incorporates many of those early demo tracks, which were recorded when Justin Broadrick was only sixteen. Dimitri Nasrallah of Exclaim! called Fall of Because's output "eerily ahead of its time".

Released eleven years after Fall of Because turned into Godflesh, Life Is Easy was recorded partially in studio and partially live. The first eight tracks were recorded and mixed at Rich Bitch studios in Birmingham, England in November 1986. Tracks 9, 10, and 11 were recorded live, with the latter two comprising complete Fall of Because shows.

The songs "Devastator" and "Life Is Easy" were rerecorded in 1989 and used in Godflesh's debut studio album, Streetcleaner. "Merciless" was rerecorded in 1994 and became the title track of a Godflesh EP. A segment of the show titled "Xmas Special" appeared as the intro of the Godflesh song "Love, Hate (Slugbaiting)" from their 1992 album Pure. Since Broadrick acted as a physical drummer in Fall of Because, there is notable difference between those early demos and the final Godflesh songs, which employ programmed drum machines and slower, more grinding tempos.

Track listing
All songs written by Justin Broadrick, G. C. Green, and Paul Neville.

Personnel
Fall of Because
 Justin Broadrick – drums, vocals
 G. C. Green – bass
 Paul Neville – guitar, vocals, tapes

Additional personnel
 Mick Harris – vocals on "Fight Show"
 Nicholas Bullen – vocals on "Fight Show"

References

1999 albums
Godflesh albums
Justin Broadrick albums
Albums produced by Justin Broadrick